From a Dying Ember  is the ninth and final studio album by Swedish power metal band Falconer, released on 26 June 2020 through Metal Blade Records. The track listing was revealed and the album went up for order on May 13, 2020.

Track listing

References 

2020 albums
Falconer (band) albums
Metal Blade Records albums